The Asia Pacific Model United Nations Conference (AMUNC) is an annual travelling model United Nations conference for university students. Each conference is hosted in a different city within the Asia-Pacific region, attracting approximately 600 students from Asia, the Pacific Islands, Australia and New Zealand, making it one of the largest regional model UN conferences in the world. AMUNC is run entirely by student volunteers, usually coordinated through a relevant student association who has been licensed with the right to host AMUNC by Asia-Pacific MUN Conference Limited, with the support and backing of the host university. The conference takes place over a week in July, encompassing a variety of activities, including role-playing committees, guest speakers, career information stalls, and an evening social activities program.

History
Established in 1995 as the Australian Model United Nations Conference, the inaugural AMUNC was hosted by the University of New South Wales and consisted of seven committees. For the next few years, AMUNC was held alternately by universities in Sydney, Canberra, Melbourne and Brisbane, and gradually grew in size. The conference eventually left the south-east in 2004 for James Cook University in Townsville in northern Queensland and was hosted overseas for the first time in 2007 by Auckland University in New Zealand.

As AMUNC grew, the increased number of foreign students and international standing warranted two amendments to its name to reflect the changed nature of the conference. In 1997 the conference became the Australasian Model United Nations Conference, and the conference changed name again in 2003 to its current version. Despite the name changes, AMUNC remained the largest conference in Australia, becoming a fixture of the Australian Model UN circuit.

The twenty-fifth session of AMUNC, to be held at Resorts World Sentosa from 7–13 July 2019 was cancelled.

The conference has been held at numerous universities across the Asia-Pacific, the most recent being held by the University of New South Wales in Sydney, Australia.

Activities

Committee sessions
Delegates at AMUNC are assigned to represent countries, governments, non-governmental organisations, or individuals within the United Nations and other regional or global organisations. Delegates are challenged to combine their personal talents and capacities with their ability to play their assigned role accurately.

Social events
Evening social events are a major component of the AMUNC itinerary, and past conferences have included committee dinners, cocktail events, club nights, and river cruises. AMUNC historically concludes with a gala on the final night of the conference.

Speaker events
Previous speakers have included Gareth Evans, former Australian Foreign Minister, Robert French, Chief Justice of the High Court of Australia, Michael Kirby, former Justice of the High Court of Australia, and Sir Geoffrey Palmer, former Prime Minister of New Zealand,  Professor Gillian Triggs, President of the Australian Human Rights Commission, and Laura John, the Australian Youth Representative to the United Nations.

Opening and closing ceremonies
The AMUNC conference is officially opened and closed by the host team, with the week's committee sessions culminating in a General Assembly session showcasing the achievements of the conference proceedings.

Controversy

2017 
AMUNC 2017, hosted by the University of Hong Kong, was the subject of severe backlash from Australian and Islamic Model UN communities, as the selected dates clashed with the final semester exams of numerous Australian universities, as well as Eid al-Fitr. In response, the Secretariat cut short the conference to make way for Eid al-Fitr, and promised to prioritize Australian applications.

2019 
As of 27 June 2019, the conference was cancelled due to internal factors.

Locations

See also
Model United Nations
List of model United Nations conferences

References

External links
Official website 
The Story of Asia Pacific Model United Nation Conference
Asia Pacific Model United Nation Conference: The Next Frontier
Become a Part of AMUNC Tradition - Asia-Pacific MUN Conference 2016 Special Interview

Model United Nations